The Winters–Wimberley House is a historic home in Wimberley, Texas that was built .  It was listed on the National Register of Historic Places in 2002.

The property has  out of an original  mill site property obtained in 1856 by William C. Winters (1809–1864) near Glendale trading post (which later became Wimberley).  Winters built a mill and a house, connected by a wagon path which eventually became Ranch Road 12, a busy county highway that eventually split the property.

The mill was later owned by a Wimberley.

See also

National Register of Historic Places listings in Hays County, Texas

References

Houses on the National Register of Historic Places in Texas
Houses completed in 1856
Houses in Hays County, Texas
National Register of Historic Places in Hays County, Texas